The 2011 Carlton Football Club season was the Carlton Football Club's 148th season of competition, and 115th as a member of the Australian Football League.

Carlton finished 5th out of 17 teams in the 2011 AFL season with a win-loss record of 14–7–1, ultimately eliminated after a three-point semi-final loss against West Coast. As of 2021, it is Carlton's best finish in any season since 2001.

Club summary
The 2011 AFL season was the 115th season of the VFL/AFL competition since its inception in 1897; and, having competed in every season, it was also the 115th season contested by the Carlton Football Club.

Former club champion Stephen Kernahan continued as club president in the 2011 season, a position he has held since August 2008. The club's two joint major sponsors, car manufacturer Hyundai and confectionery company Mars, were unchanged from 2010. As in previous years, the club's primary home ground was Etihad Stadium, with home games expecting to draw larger crowds played at the M.C.G., and with traditional home ground Visy Park serving as the training and administrative base. As has been the case every year since 2003, Carlton has a full alignment with the Northern Bullants in the Victorian Football League, allowing Carlton-listed players to play with the Bullants when not selected in AFL matches.

Carlton set a new club record by selling 43,791 memberships for the 2011 season. The previous high of 42,408 members, set in 2009, was surpassed on 9 June. The club had the fourth-highest membership in the league, and the second-highest of clubs who play home games only in Victoria, behind only Collingwood. The club's membership campaign slogan for 2011 was "No passengers."

Brett Ratten and Chris Judd continued in their respective roles as senior coach and captain of the club, each entering his fourth season appointed to the job. Kade Simpson continued in the role of vice-captain, and Michael Jamison and Andrew Carrazzo retained their places in the club's leadership group from 2010. Bryce Gibbs, Marc Murphy and Jordan Russell were elevated into the expanded leadership group for 2011, replacing Heath Scotland, who stepped down, and Simon Wiggins, who retired from the AFL at the end of 2010.

There was a substantial number of changes to Brett Ratten's senior coaching panel between 2010 and 2011. The contracts of forward-line assistant coach Matthew Lappin and defensive assistant coach Brett Montgomery were not renewed, with the pair taking assistant coaching roles at Collingwood and the Western Bulldogs respectively. Midfield assistant coach Robert Harvey, and development coach/VFL senior coach David Teague also left to pursue assistant coaching roles at St Kilda and West Coast respectively. Darren Harris, who had been serving as development manager since 2009, stepped into Teague's role as development coach and VFL senior coach, and Luke Webster also joined the club as a development coach.

Carlton adopted a new 'clash guernsey' design for the 2011 season. The new design was predominantly sky blue, with navy blue CFC monogram, numbers, trimming and side-panels. The sky blue guernsey replaced a predominantly white clash guernsey which had been in use since 2007. The guernsey was worn with new sky blue shorts, and the traditional navy blue socks (with a white hoop added in the event of clashing socks). The clash guernsey was first worn in Round 7 against .

Squad and player statistics for 2011
Flags represent the state of origin, i.e. the state in which the player played his Under-18s football.

Playing list changes

The following summarises all player changes between the conclusion of the 2010 season and the conclusion of the 2011 season.

In

Out

List management

Season summary

Pre-season matches

NAB Cup

NAB Challenge

Regular season
2011 was Carlton's best regular season performance for more than a decade. The team finished in fifth place with a record of 14–7–1, two wins above  in sixth, and two-and-a-half wins below  in fourth. Carlton spent the entire season between second and fifth on the ladder. Performances were consistent throughout the year based on finishing position, including:
A record of 0–5 in five games against the top four teams; the performances in those games were competitive, with an average losing margin of 19 points, and the largest loss by only 36 points;
A record of 4–1–1 in six games against teams which finished between sixth and eighth;
A record of 10–1 in eleven games against teams which failed to reach the finals, with the Round 16 match against the Western Bulldogs accounting for the only big upset loss of Carlton's season.

Through the latter half of the season, Carlton was mostly in a fight with Hawthorn and West Coast to claim third and fourth positions. Although Carlton held fourth place for much of the latter half of the year, West Coast was always in a strong position to overtake Carlton in the final rounds due to having a game in hand and more games against non-finalists. West Coast ultimately moved into the top four in Round 22, after Carlton's loss against Hawthorn.

Finals
In the elimination final against Essendon, Carlton fell fourteen points behind during the first quarter, after kicking five early behinds to Essendon's three goals; the Blues then kicked the next ten goals of the game before half time to set up an unbeatable lead, and finished with a comfortable 62-point win.

In the semi-final against West Coast, Carlton kicked the first four goals of the match, before conceding eight goals to three in the second quarter to trail by 11 points at half-time. The second half was closely fought, with West Coast maintaining a one- to three-goal lead for most of the half. After the Eagles opened the lead to 21 points during time-on in the final quarter, Carlton kicked the last three goals of the game to narrow the margin to less than a goal; but, time expired, and West Coast won by three points.

 H ^ Home match.
 A ^ Away match.

Ladder

Leading Goalkickers 
Andrew Walker was Carlton's leading goalkicker for 2011. It was the first time Walker had won the club goalkicking. He had kicked only 37 goals in his first seven seasons, but after struggling to hold his place in the team in 2010 as a midfielder, he became a permanent forward in 2011, where he kicked 56 goals in 24 games.

In addition to Walker's 56 goals, Eddie Betts kicked 50 goals and Jeff Garlett kicked 48 goals; all three players finished inside the top twenty for the Coleman Medal. Carlton was the only club to have three players kick more than 40 goals in the home and away season.

Team awards and records
Game records
 Round 2 – Carlton's score of 26.15 (171) against  was its highest in any game since Round 18, 2000, and its highest ever outside the city of Melbourne.
 Round 2 – Carlton's winning margin of 119 points against  was its highest in any game since Round 10, 2001; and, its highest ever outside the city of Melbourne.
 Round 2 – Carlton's first quarter score of 9.5 (59) against  was its highest first quarter score in any game since Round 2, 1984.
 Round 3 – the attendance of 88,181 at the Carlton vs  match was the highest ever for a home-and-away match between the two teams, and was the second-highest for a Carlton home-and-away match against any opponent.
 Round 6 – Carlton's win against  at the S.C.G. was its first win in Sydney since Round 7, 1993, breaking a losing streak of ten matches (seven matches at the S.C.G. and three matches at ANZ Stadium).
 Round 10 – Melbourne's score of 6.10 (46) was the lowest score conceded by Carlton in any game since Round 5, 2004.
 Round 11 - Carlton held  scoreless in the final quarter, the first time since Round 19, 1999 that Carlton had kept a team scoreless for a quarter of football.
 Round 15 – Carlton's score of 28.16 (184) against  was its highest in any game since Round 17, 1998, and its highest ever in any game against Richmond, breaking the previous record of 28.9 (177) set in the 1972 VFL Grand Final.
 Round 15 – Carlton's score in the second half, 17.9 (111), was its highest in a half of any game since Round 18, 2000.
 First Elimination Final – Carlton's win against  was its first win in a finals match since the First Elimination Final, 2001, on 8 September 2001, a drought of ten years, three days. The club featured in three losing finals during the drought.
 First Elimination Final – the attendance of 90,161 was a new record for the highest in VFL/AFL history for an Elimination Final; this record was surpassed in 2013.

Season records
Carlton's home and away record of 14–7–1 was its best since 2000.
Carlton's home and away season placing of 5th was its best since 2001.
Carlton's final placing of 5th was its best since 2000.
Carlton conceded only 1700 points in the home and away season, its fewest since 1976.
Carlton's percentage of 130.88 was its best since 2000.

Other
 Round 2 – Carlton was the first ever opponent of the newly admitted Gold Coast Football Club in an AFL premiership match. (Gold Coast was scheduled with a bye in Round 1).
 Round 18 – Carlton won the 2011 Madden Cup with its 74-point win over Essendon.
 First Elimination Final – Carlton's played its first finals match in Melbourne since the First Semi-final, 2001, on 15 September 2001, a drought of nine years, 361 days. The club featured in two interstate finals during the drought.

Individual awards and records

John Nicholls Medal
The Carlton Football Club Best and Fairest awards night took place on 4 October. The John Nicholls Medal, for the best and fairest player of the club, as well as several other awards, were presented on the night..

John Nicholls Medal
The voting system for the John Nicholls Medal remained the same as in 2010. In each match, the five members of the Match Committee awarded votes. Each committee member could award votes to up to eight players, and each player could receive up to ten votes from each judge. A "perfect score" for a round is 50 votes. The player with the most total votes across all premiership season matches (including home and away matches and finals) wins the award.

The winner of the John Nicholls Medal was Marc Murphy, who polled 678 votes. It was the first John Nicholls Medal of Murphy's career. Murphy won comfortably ahead of Chris Judd (469 votes) and Bryce Gibbs (448 votes). The top ten is given below.

Other awards
The following other awards were presented on John Nicholls Medal night:-
Best First-Year Player – Nick Duigan
Best Clubman – Heath Scotland
Best Player in Finals – Marc Murphy
Women of Carlton Ambassador Award – Chris Yarran
Spirit of Carlton Encouragement Award – Kade Simpson and Mitch Robinson
Carltonians Achievement Award – Heath Scotland
Blues Coterie "Fierce Award" – Mitch Robinson

Brownlow Medal
The lead-up to the 2011 Brownlow Medal focussed heavily on Carlton. Chris Judd entered the night as a strong favourite to win; a series of eye-catching performances meant he became the outright favourite early in the season; after Round 20, major betting agency Sportsbet was offering odds shorter than $2 for Judd to win, and decided to pay out early to all punters who had already backed Judd for the win. Murphy also figured prominently in Brownlow markets during the season, fuelled by his career-best season, and very strong polling in other MVP awards, most notably the AFL Coaches Association Player of the Year Award. Bookmakers were offering odds as short as $5.50 in Round 18, when Murphy was second-favourite behind Judd. By the end of the season, Murphy was fifth-favourite behind Judd, 's Adam Goodes and 's Scott Pendlebury and Dane Swan.

In the end, neither player won the medal. Judd polled 23 votes to finish equal 5th, and Murphy polled 19 votes to finish equal 7th, out of eligible players. Bryce Gibbs was the only other Carlton player with double figures, polling 12 votes.

AFLPA Awards 
For each of the AFLPA awards, one or three Carlton players were nominated following internal vote of Carlton players (except for Best Captain, where captain Chris Judd was nominated by default). A vote of all players in the league, selecting from a ballot of all club nominees, was then used to determine the final placings.

Chris Judd won the Leigh Matthews Trophy for the second time in his career, the first being in 2006 when he was playing for the West Coast Eagles. He became the fifth player to win the award more than once. He polled 1,347 votes, almost three times as many as second-place finisher Scott Pendlebury. He also won the Best Captain Award for the first time in his career.

Leigh Matthews Trophy (Most Valuable Player)
Chris Judd (winner)
Marc Murphy (nominated)
Kade Simpson (nominated)
Robert Rose Award (Most Courageous Player)
Kade Simpson (nominated)
Best First Year Player
Nick Duigan (nominated)
Best Captain
Chris Judd (winner)

Other awards
All-Australian Team
The 40-man squad for the All-Australian Team was announced on 6 September 2011, and the final team of 22 was announced on 19 September 2011, with Judd and Murphy both nominated in the team. It was the sixth All-Australian guernsey for Judd, who was made vice-captain for the second time (having also served once as captain), and it was Murphy's first time as an All-Australian.
Chris Judd (ruck rover, vice captain)
Marc Murphy (half forward flank)
Eddie Betts (nominated in 40-man squad)
Heath Scotland (nominated in 40-man squad)

Most Valuable Player awards
Judd and Murphy both featured prominently in most valuable player awards, voted on by various broadcasters, commentators and professional associations of the AFL (only appearances in the top five of each award are shown):
AFL Coaches Association Champion Player of the Year – Marc Murphy (winner), Chris Judd (2nd)
The Age Footballer of the Year – Marc Murphy (winner), Chris Judd (3rd)
Herald Sun Player of the Year – Chris Judd (2nd), Marc Murphy (5th)
Lou Richards Medal (Nine's Wide World of Sports player of the year) – Marc Murphy (2nd), Chris Judd (3rd)
ABC Footballer of the Year – Chris Judd (4th)
SEN 1116 Marbletrend Player of the Year – Chris Judd (2nd)
Triple M Bonaire Best on Ground – Chris Judd (2nd)
3AW Player of the Year – Chris Judd (2nd)

Representative honours
Andrew Walker, Eddie Betts and Chris Yarran were all selected in the Indigenous All-Stars squad for the All-Stars' pre-season match against ; however, the match was ultimately cancelled due to inclement weather.
Mitch Robinson was selected in the Australian team and Zach Tuohy was selected in the Irish team for the 2011 International rules series.

Mark of the Year
Andrew Walker's Round 18 mark was one of the three finalists in the Mark of the Year. It had been the favourite to win, with many football observers, including The Age's Rohan Connolly, and both match-day coaches, Brett Ratten and James Hird, stating that it was one of the greatest marks of all-time; however, it was beaten for the season's Mark of the Year award by Andrew Krakouer's Round 9 mark.

Overall, five Carlton marks were nominated throughout the season, and all five won their individual Mark of the Week votes.
Mark of the Year – Andrew Walker, Round 18 (nominated)
Mark of the Week:
 Round 5 – Andrew Walker (winner)
 Round 12 – Shaun Hampson (winner)
 Round 18 – Andrew Walker (winner)
 Round 19 – Nick Duigan (winner)
 Round 21 – Andrew Walker (winner)

Goal of the Year
Eddie Betts' Round 18 goal was nominated amongst the three finalists for Goal of the Year. Overall, three Carlton goals were nominated throughout the season, and all three won their individual Goal of the Week votes.
Goal of the Year – Eddie Betts, Round 18 (nominated)
Goal of the Week:
 Round 9 – Chris Judd (winner)
 Round 12 – Eddie Betts (winner)
 Round 18 – Eddie Betts (winner)

Rising Star
No Carlton players were nominated for the NAB AFL Rising Star Award during 2011.

Other
The Deadly Award for Outstanding Achievement in AFL was won by Andrew Walker. The Deadly Awards are awarded annually across a variety of fields, not only sport, to Aboriginal Australians and Torres Strait Islanders.

Former premiership player and coach Robert Walls was elevated to Legend status in the Carlton Football Club Hall of Fame.

Andrew Walker, Heath Scotland and Andrew Carrazzo were all awarded life membership of the club at the AGM in December, as recognition for eight years of senior service.

Player records
 Elimination Final – Kade Simpson played his 143rd consecutive game. At the time, this was recognised as a new Carlton Football Club record, breaking the record of Jim Francis, who played 142 consecutive games between 1935-1942. However, in December 2012, the AFL amended the interpretation of this record such that interstate matches played on the same weekend as a club match were counted as part of a streak of consecutive games; as a result, Bruce Doull assumed the club record with 162 consecutive games between 1971–1978.

Milestones

Northern Bullants 
The Carlton Football Club had a full affiliation with the Northern Bullants during the 2011 season. It was the ninth season of the clubs' affiliation, which had been in place since 2003. Carlton senior- and rookie-listed players who were not selected to play in the Carlton team were eligible to play for either the Northern Bullants seniors or reserves team, including both Victorian Football League matches and Foxtel Cup matches. As in 2010, home games were shared between the Bullants' traditional home ground, Preston City Oval, and Carlton's traditional home ground, Visy Park.

The Bullants finished 4th out of 13 in the VFL, after being defeated in the preliminary final by Port Melbourne. The Bullants had finished sixth on the ladder after the home-and-away season with a record of 10–8. Additionally, in the inaugural season of the Foxtel Cup, the Bullants reached the second round (quarter finals) before being eliminated by eventual runners-up Claremont. Carlton's Brock McLean, who played nineteen matches for the Bullants through the year, won the Laurie Hill Trophy as the Bullants' best and fairest.

Notes
:1. Although Hawthorn had a higher overall membership, that Victorian-based club additionally plays several home games in Tasmania each year.
:2. Ratten also served as head coach in the final six rounds of 2007 as caretaker, before being officially appointed as head coach for 2008.
:3. Many draft picks involved in trades changed their position slightly on draft day (e.g Carlton acquired pick No. 33 in the trade for Sam Jacobs, then used pick No. 34 to draft Pat McCarthy), because the use of compensatory draft picks in the early rounds of the draft or passing in later rounds of the draft led to the draft picks being re-numbered.

References

Carlton Football Club seasons
Carlton